The 1994–95 season of the Slovak Second Football League (also known as 2. liga) was the second season of the league since its establishment. It began in late July 1994 and ended in June 1995.

League standing

Promotion play-offs

See also
1994–95 Slovak Superliga

References
 Jindřich Horák, Lubomír Král: Encyklopedie našeho fotbalu, Libri 1997
 Igor Mráz: Päť rokov futbalu, SFZ 1998

2. Liga (Slovakia) seasons
2
Slovak